El Copey is a town and municipality in the Colombian Department of Cesar, in the northeast of Colombia. It is 105 km away from the Capitol of the department, Valledupar.

References

External links
 El Copey official website

Municipalities of Cesar Department